This is a list of candidates for the 1864–65 New South Wales colonial election. The election was held from 22 November 1864 to 10 January 1865.

There was no recognisable party structure at this election.

Retiring Members
David Bell MLA (Camden)
James Buchanan MLA (Goldfields North)
Edward Close MLA (Morpeth)
William Dalley MLA (Carcoar)
Joseph Harpur MLA (Patrick's Plains)
Robert Haworth MLA (Illawarra)
Thomas Holt MLA (Newtown)
Clark Irving MLA (Clarence)
Henry Milford MLA (Braidwood)
William Redman MLA (Queanbeyan)
John Ryan MLA (Lachlan)
Richard Sadleir MLA (Lower Hunter)
Isaac Shepherd MLA (St Leonards)
Robert Stewart MLA (East Sydney)
Elias Weekes MLA (West Maitland)

Legislative Assembly
Sitting members are shown in bold text. Successful candidates are highlighted.

Electorates are arranged chronologically from the day the poll was held. Because of the sequence of polling, some sitting members who were defeated in their constituencies were then able to contest other constituencies later in the polling period. On the second occasion, these members are shown in italic text.

See also
 Members of the New South Wales Legislative Assembly, 1864–1869

References
 

1864-65